The Tokrau is a river in Karaganda Region, Kazakhstan.

The Tokrau flows by Aktogay, the administrative center of Aktogay District, Karaganda Region, as well as by Saryterek village. Its mouth lies northeast of Balkhash City and east of the Bektauata range. The Egizkoytas burial complex of the Bronze Age and Early Iron Age is located in the upper course of the river.

The Tokrau Formation, a fossiliferous stratigraphic unit in Kazakhastan whose strata date back to the Paleozoic, was named after the river.

Course
The Tokrau river originates in the Kyzyltas range of the southern Kazakh Uplands,  to the north of Mt Karashoki. It heads roughly southwards within a narrow channel all along its course. Finally its waters disperse in the semidesert sands to the north of the lakeshore. This last stretch of the Tokrau was an ancient delta dating back to the time when the river reached Lake Balkhash.

The Tokrau is fed mainly by winter snows. Its water is fresh and the river channel fills between March and May, although less often it may fill in late autumn too. The lower stretch frequently dries up, stagnating into disconnected pools. Very rarely, in years of abundant spring floods, the waters of the river may break through the desert area and trickle into lake Balkhash.

Tributaries

See also
List of fossiliferous stratigraphic units in Kazakhstan
List of rivers of Kazakhstan

References

External links
The Great Silk Road in Central and Eastern Kazakhstan
Plant diversity in the early Devonian

Rivers of Kazakhstan
Balkhash-Alakol Basin

ru:Токрау (река)